Inape intermedia is a species of moth of the family Tortricidae which is endemic to Peru.

The ground colour of the forewings is cream brown with brownish strigulae and brown spots along the tornus. The markings are dark brown. The hindwings are brownish grey, but creamer towards the base.

Etymology
The species name refers to the intermediate position of the species and is derived from Latin intermedia (meaning intermediate).

References

Moths described in 2010
Endemic fauna of Peru
Moths of South America
intermedia
Taxa named by Józef Razowski